Andrei Ion Coroian (born 28 January 1991) is a Romanian footballer.

Club statistics

Updated to games played as of 30 November 2014.

External links
 
 
 profile at the playersagent.com
 MLSZ 

1991 births
Living people
People from Câmpia Turzii
Romanian footballers
Romania youth international footballers
Association football midfielders
Brescia Calcio players
Liga II players
CF Liberty Oradea players
FC Bihor Oradea players
Nemzeti Bajnokság I players
Kaposvári Rákóczi FC players
Lombard-Pápa TFC footballers
CS Minaur Baia Mare (football) players
Romanian expatriate footballers
Romanian expatriate sportspeople in Italy
Expatriate footballers in Italy
Romanian expatriate sportspeople in Hungary
Expatriate footballers in Hungary